Ponciano Contreras (born 16 April 1947) is a Mexican wrestler. He competed in the men's Greco-Roman 63 kg at the 1968 Summer Olympics.

References

External links
 

1947 births
Living people
Mexican male sport wrestlers
Olympic wrestlers of Mexico
Wrestlers at the 1968 Summer Olympics
Sportspeople from Durango